Pleurosicya is a genus of gobies native to reef environments of the Indian Ocean and the western Pacific Ocean.

Species
There are currently 17 recognized species in this genus:
 Pleurosicya annandalei Hornell & Fowler, 1922 (Scaly-nape goby)
 Pleurosicya australis Larson, 1990
 Pleurosicya bilobata (Koumans, 1941) (Bilobed ghostgoby)
 Pleurosicya boldinghi M. C. W. Weber, 1913 (Soft-coral goby)
 Pleurosicya carolinensis Larson, 1990 (Caroline Islands ghostgoby)
 Pleurosicya coerulea Larson, 1990 (Blue-coral ghostgoby)
 Pleurosicya elongata Larson, 1990 (Cling goby)
 Pleurosicya fringilla Larson, 1990 (Staghorn ghostgoby)
 Pleurosicya labiata (M. C. W. Weber, 1913) (Barrel-sponge ghostgoby)
 Pleurosicya larsonae D. W. Greenfield & J. E. Randall, 2004
 Pleurosicya micheli Fourmanoir, 1971 (Michel's ghostgoby)
 Pleurosicya mossambica J. L. B. Smith, 1959 (Toothy goby) 
 Pleurosicya muscarum (D. S. Jordan & Seale, 1906) (Ghost goby)
 Pleurosicya occidentalis Larson, 1990
 Pleurosicya plicata Larson, 1990 (Plicata ghostgoby)
 Pleurosicya prognatha Goren, 1984 (Folded ghostgoby)
 Pleurosicya spongicola Larson, 1990 (Sponge ghostgoby)

References

Gobiidae